The Pacific Nations Cup is an international rugby union competition held between three Pacific states: Fiji, Samoa and Tonga.  The 2019 edition of the tournament will also include the national teams of Canada, Japan and United States. First held in 2006, the tournament is intended to strengthen the Tier 2 rugby teams by providing competitive test matches in a tournament format.

Previously, Japan participated from 2006 to 2015, New Zealand from 2006 to 2009, Australia from 2007 to 2008, and Canada and the United States from 2013 to 2015. The inaugural tournament was the only one that carried the title of IRB Pacific 5 Nations; from 2007 the competition was known as the IRB Pacific Nations Cup.

Format
The tournament is a round-robin, where each team plays one match against each of the other teams. There are four points for a win, two points for a draw and none for a defeat. There are also bonus points offered with one bonus point for scoring four or more tries in a match and one bonus point for losing by 7 points or fewer.

The tournament generally occurs every year in the June mid-year international test window. The tournament was played mainly throughout June, with the last round in early July. The revised tournament begins in May due to pre-existing Test commitments and concludes in late June.

History
The Pacific Nations Cup was funded as an International Rugby Board (IRB) tournament which was part of the $US50 million, three-year, global strategic investment programme launched in August 2005. The competition was aimed at developing the Pacific rim sides in the second tier of the rugby countries: Fiji, Japan, Samoa and Tonga. The Junior All Blacks were also invited to compete, who are New Zealand's second XV. "The IRB Pacific 5 Nations is a tournament that will provide more certainty for Fiji, Japan, Samoa and Tonga in terms of regular high level Test match rugby, while also providing a high level of competition for the Junior All Blacks," said Mark Egan, the IRB's Head of Rugby Services.

In the first year only it was called the IRB Pacific 5 Nations and did not include Australia. Australia had been invited to take part in the inaugural 2006 tournament but decided against sending a team stating that they wanted to focus on their domestic competition. The inaugural tournament kicked off 3 June 2006 and was played in a round-robin format, with some games being held in Australia. The Junior All Blacks won all of their matches en route to winning the 2006 tournament. The inaugural tournament was a success in providing a platform for Pacific states and Japan in gaining valuable exposure.

Australia A joined an expanded competition for the 2007 season. The inclusion of Australia A meant that the tier 2 teams would have an even greater number of matches in the buildup to the 2007 Rugby World Cup. For Australia, it provided a stepping stone for Wallaby selection. Following the 2008 tournament, however, the ARU announced Australia A would not play in 2009 due to the current economic environment. Australia has not participated since then.

In 2008, the New Zealand Māori team replaced the Junior All Blacks in the competition. The New Zealand Rugby Union had decided that the New Zealand Māori needed to play more matches at home and that the Junior All Blacks would not be assembled in 2008 for reasons of "player welfare." The Junior All Blacks returned for the 2009 tournament, but no New Zealand team has participated since then.

From 2010 to 2012, the Pacific Nations Cup was a four-team tournament, contested by Japan, Fiji, Samoa and Tonga, with Samoa winning in 2010 and 2012, and Japan winning in 2011.

In January 2013, the IRB announced that both the USA and Canadian rugby teams would be joining the 2013 competition on a permanent basis. For the first time, the reigning champion Samoan team did not compete as they took part in a competition in South Africa.

The World Rugby Pacific Nations Cup was downscaled for 2016 and 2017 with these two editions featuring only Fiji, Samoa and Tonga. The sides from Canada, Japan and United States played in their respective regional qualifiers for the 2019 Rugby World Cup. As part of the Oceanian qualification, places at the 2019 Rugby World Cup were awarded to the two top teams of the 2016 and 2017 PNC (on aggregate), whereas the bottom team played a repechage match against the second best Rugby Europe Championship team.  was invited for the 2018 tournament hosted in Suva.

For 2019, Canada, Japan and the United States returned to the tournament, serving as a prelude to the 2019 Rugby World Cup. Japan won without losing a match.

Teams
The teams in the Pacific Nations Cup and their finishing positions are as follows:

Notes:
 The 2014 tournament was split into conferences without crossover matches or finals. Samoa and Japan won their respective conference titles.

Commercial sponsorship

On 20 June 2008 the International Rugby Board announced that regional financial institution ANZ had agreed to become presenting sponsor of the competition, as well as the FORU Oceania Cup and the Pacific Rugby Cup.

Results

Champions by year

Championships by team

Points summary

Updated: 15 July 2017
Source: statbunker.com

Notes:
 The 2014 tournament was split into conferences with Samoa and Japan winning their respective conference titles.

 The totals cited from statbunker.com include classification finals from 2015 which were not regular season games. While their match data (P W D L PF PA PD) is accurate, the statbunker figures for bonus points and log points are unreliable and those stats are not included in the table above.

Top scorers

The following tables contain points and tries scored in the Pacific Nations Cup.

Top points scorers

Last updated: 11 August 2019  Source: statbunker.com

Top try scorers

 Last updated: 11 August 2019  Source: statbunker.com

Venues 
Below is a table listing all the venues that have been used in the tournaments, listed with the number of matches each venue has hosted annually and historically:

Table updated to 2017 tournament

See also
 World Rugby Pacific Challenge

References

External links
 Pacific Nations Cup web page at World Rugby

 
Pacific
Rugby union competitions in Oceania for national teams